South Fork Township is one of fifteen townships in Forsyth County, North Carolina, United States. The township had a population of 2,576 according to the 2010 census.

South Fork Township occupies  in southern Forsyth County.  There are no incorporated municipalities in South Fork and much of the original township has been annexed by the City of Winston-Salem and made part of Winston Township.

References

Townships in Forsyth County, North Carolina
Townships in North Carolina